Adcom Systems is an Emirati unmanned aerial vehicle manufacturer based in the United Arab Emirates. It is made up of a group of 20 private companies.

History

Adcom began producing drones as early as 2002 in the United Arab Emirates. The company rose to the challenge of producing unmanned combat aerial vehicle (UCAV) for the United Arab Emirates Air Force as a result of the United States denying the sale of General Atomics MQ-9 Reaper technology.

Products

Adcom began as a missile manufacturer before moving on to developing strategic radars and then to UAVs and advanced communication systems. Its main drones are designed to fly at high altitude and fly for hours while carrying up to 10 missiles. Adcom manufactures a series of drones referred to as Yabhon which includes the Yabhon HALE (high-altitude long-endurance) and Yabhon MALE (medium-altitude long-endurance). Its largest drone is known as the United 40 and is named in honor of the 40th year of the UAE union when the drone was built. It also manufactures the Yabhon NSR which is the first UAV in the world to hunt other UAVs.

Unmanned aerial vehicles

Export
In 2016, Nigerian military procured Yabhon Flash-20 from the United Arab Emirates.

In December 2018, the Algerian Ministry of Defence revealed it has procured and is operating at least two Yabhon United 40 UAVs, and two Yabhon Flash-20 UAVs.

References

Unmanned aerial vehicle manufacturers
Companies based in Abu Dhabi
Emirati companies established in 1991